The fourth season of CSI: Crime Scene Investigation premiered on CBS on September 25, 2003, and ended May 20, 2004. The series stars William Petersen and Marg Helgenberger.

Plot
Nick accidentally leaks information to a news reporter ("Assume Nothing"), and Catherine tries to discover how a body ended up in a bathtub ("All for Our Country") during the fourth season of CSI. Supervised by Grissom and Willows, the Las Vegas CSIs are tasked with investigating the bizarre, the unlikely, and the unprecedented, including a disappearing gun ("Homebodies"), the death of a baby during a heatwave ("Feeling the Heat"), a case of raccoon versus big rig ("Fur and Loathing"), a car-bombing ("Grissom Versus the Volcano"), and the derailment of a roller-coaster ("Turn of the Screws"). Meanwhile, Catherine usurps a case from Nick and Sara ("After the Show"), the team have to re-investigate a rape-murder ("Invisible Evidence"), Grissom heads to Jackpot, Nevada ("Jackpot"), and team take part in a CSI relay, bringing together investigative teams from across America ("Dead Ringer").

Cast

Main cast

 William Petersen as Gil Grissom, a CSI Level 3 Supervisor
 Marg Helgenberger as Catherine Willows, a CSI Level 3 Assistant Supervisor
 Gary Dourdan as Warrick Brown, a CSI Level 3
 George Eads as Nick Stokes, a CSI Level 3
 Jorja Fox as Sara Sidle, a CSI Level 3
 Eric Szmanda as Greg Sanders, a DNA Technician
 Robert David Hall as Al Robbins, the Chief Medical Examiner
 Paul Guilfoyle as Jim Brass, a Homicide Detective Captain

Recurring cast

 Wallace Langham as David Hodges
 David Berman as David Phillips 
 Archie Kao as Archie Johnson

Episodes

References

External links
 DVD Release Dates at TVShowsOnDVD.com.

04
2003 American television seasons
2004 American television seasons